Poecilocharax rhizophilus is a species of fish discovered alongside Poecilocharax callipterus.

Description 
Poecilocharax rhizophilus is found in the Apuí region of Brazil. It is around 2 centimeters long. The species is bright amber yellow-brown like other fish in the area. Males have dark streaks on the dorsal fin and anal fins.

References 

Crenuchidae
Fish described in 2022